Blood and Ashes is the debut album by hip hop duo OuterSpace, released on July 27, 2004, by Babygrande Records. It features collaborations by Jedi Mind Tricks member Vinnie Paz, Immortal Technique, Sadat X from Brand Nubian and fellow A.O.T.P. members 7L & Esoteric, Celph Titled, Des Devious & King Syze.

Track listing

References 

2004 albums
OuterSpace albums
Babygrande Records albums